Chicoreus ramosus, common name the ramose murex or branched murex, is a species of predatory sea snail, a marine gastropod mollusk in the family Muricidae, the murex snails. It is considered an economically important species in the Indo-West Pacific, especially in India.

Distribution
This sea snail is found widely spread in the Indo-West Pacific, and occurs from east to South Africa, including Mozambique, Tanzania, Madagascar, the Red Sea, the Gulf of Oman, Aldabra, Chagos and Mauritius. It also occurs in eastern Polynesia, southern Japan, New Caledonia and Queensland in Australia.<ref name="Poutiers">{{Cite book|last=Poutiers|first=J. M.|title=The living marine resources of the Western Central Pacific Volume 1. Seaweeds, corals, bivalves and gastropods|editor=Carpenter, K. E.|editor2=Niem, V. H.|publisher=FAO|location=Rome|year=1998|series=FAO Species Identification Guide for Fishery Purposes|volume=1|pages=562|chapter=Gastropods|isbn=92-5-104052-4|url=ftp://ftp.fao.org/docrep/fao/009/w7191e/w7191e50.pdf}}</ref>

Shell descriptionC. ramosus has a large, solid, very rugged and heavy shell, of up to 330 mm in length. It has a relatively globose outline, possessing a short spire, a slightly inflated body whorl, and a moderately long siphonal canal. One of its most striking ornamentations are the conspicuous, leaf-like, recurved hollow digitations. It also presents three spinose axial varices per whorl, with two elongated nodes between them. The shell is coloured white to light brown externally, with a white aperture, generally pink towards the inner edge, the outer lip and the columella.

Ecology
Habitat
The Ramose murex inhabits sandy and rubble bottoms near coral reefs, to depths of around 10 m.

Feeding habits

As is the case in other Muricidae, C. ramosus'' is a carnivorous predatory species, usually feeding on bivalves and other gastropods.

References

 Kilburn, R.N. & Rippey, E. (1982) Sea Shells of Southern Africa. Macmillan South Africa, Johannesburg, xi + 249 pp.
 Steyn, D.G & Lussi, M. (2005). Offshore Shells of Southern Africa: A pictorial guide to more than 750 Gastropods. Published by the authors. pp. i–vi, 1–289
 Houart R., Kilburn R.N. & Marais A.P. (2010) Muricidae. pp. 176–270, in: Marais A.P. & Seccombe A.D. (eds), Identification guide to the seashells of South Africa. Volume 1. Groenkloof: Centre for Molluscan Studies. 376 pp.

External links
 Linnaeus, C. (1758). Systema Naturae per regna tria naturae, secundum classes, ordines, genera, species, cum characteribus, differentiis, synonymis, locis. Editio decima, reformata [10th revised edition, vol. 1: 824 pp. Laurentius Salvius: Holmiae. , available online at https://biodiversitylibrary.org/page/726886
page(s): 747]
 Branch, G. M. (2002). Two Oceans. 5th impression. David Philip, Cate Town & Johannesburg 

Chicoreus
Gastropods described in 1758
Taxa named by Carl Linnaeus
Marine gastropods